The International Affiliation of Writers Guilds is an international trade union federation representing guilds of professional screenwriters and playwrights. Some affiliates also belong to national trade union federations.

Activities
The IAWG strives to ensure that fair royalties and residuals are collected by enforcement of copyrights.  If a member of one guild emigrates to another country or the movie or play is exported, member guilds automatically recognize their membership through reciprocal agreements.

A core function is the registering of scripts to verify original authorship.  Most affiliates also have annual award ceremonies to celebrate accomplishments in the craft.

History
The International Writers' Guild was founded in 1966 by unions from the United Kingdom, United States, and Yugoslavia.  It gradually grew, but in 1986 it was replaced by the "International Affiliation of Writers' Guilds", with its founding members all being in English-speaking countries.  It has since expanded, with affiliates from several other countries.  In 2007, it organised an International Day of Solidarity with the Writers Guild of America strike.  Since 2009, it has worked closely with the Federation of Screenwriters in Europe. There are 50,000 writers in the IAWG.

Affiliates 
 La Guilde Française des Scénaristes (France)
 New Zealand Writers Guild
 Screenwriters Association (India)
 Scriptwriters' Guild of Israel
 Société des Auteurs de Radio, Télévision et Cinéma (Canada)
 Verband Deutscher Drehbuchautoren (Germany)
 Writers Guild of America, East
 Writers Guild of America, West
 Writers Guild of Canada
 Writers' Guild of Great Britain
 Writers' Guild of Ireland
 Writers' Guild of South Africa

Chairs
2005: Carl Gottlieb
2009: Michael Winship

See also

 Federation of Scriptwriters in Europe
 Union Network International

References

 
Writers' organizations
Global union federations
Trade unions established in 1986